Elsa Desmond (born 6 August 1997) is an English-born luger who competes for Ireland.

Early life
Desmond was born in Buckingham in 1997. Her paternal grandparents were from County Cavan and County Cork, Ireland. She grew up in England, India and Turkey, and was part of the University of London Air Squadron.

Sporting career

Desmond began to compete in luge in 2018. She competed for Ireland at the 2022 Winter Olympics in the women's singles event.

Personal life
Desmond studied medicine at King's College London, and began to work at Southend University Hospital in July 2021. She aims to work as an anaesthesiologist in air rescue services.

See also
 Ireland at the 2022 Winter Olympics

References

External links

 
 
 
 

1997 births
Living people
Irish female lugers
Olympic lugers of Ireland
Lugers at the 2022 Winter Olympics
English people of Irish descent